A high pressure injection injury is an injury caused by high-pressure injection of oil, grease, diesel fuel, gasoline, solvents, water, or even air, into the body. The most common causes are accidents with grease guns, paint sprayers, and pressure washers, but working on diesel and gasoline engine fuel injection systems as well as pinhole leaks in pressurized hydraulic lines can also cause this injury.  Additionally, there is at least one known case of deliberate self-injection with a grease gun.

Although the initial wound often seems minor, the unseen, internal damage can be severe.  With hydraulic fluids, paint, and detergents, these injuries are extremely serious as most hydraulic fluids and organic solvents are highly toxic.  Delay in surgical treatment often leads to amputations or death.  But even with pure water or air, these injuries cause compartment syndrome, which leads to cell death if surgical intervention is delayed.

See also

References

External links 

High-Pressure Injection Injuries - Medscape

Injuries